The Saskatoon Queen's Hotel fire was a structure fire that occurred on May 31, 1980, in the basement of the Queen's Hotel, 1st Avenue South, Saskatoon, Saskatchewan, Canada. For the first time in Saskatoon's history, two firefighters were killed while attempting to extinguish the flames; Victor James Budz and Dennis Aron Guenter. In 2016, a memorial plaque was unveiled at the site of the fire, now the Scotiabank Theatre.

References

External links
City of Saskatoon Archives - History of Saskatoon
Saskatoon Chronology: 1882 - 2005 (PDF)

Building and structure fires in Canada
1980 disasters in Canada
1980 in Canada
1980
1980
1980 fires in North America
Hotel fires
1980 in Saskatchewan
May 1980 events in Canada